Norman Reid  (26 December 1890 – 5–6 June 1947) was a South African cricketer who played one Test match for South Africa in 1921.

Born in Cape Town, Reid was educated at Diocesan College in Rondebosch and at Oriel College, Oxford, where he was awarded a rugby union Blue in 1912 and 1913. In the First World War he served in South-West Africa with the Imperial Light Horse before transferring to the Royal Field Artillery in France. He was wounded twice and received the Distinguished Service Order and the Military Cross. On his return to South Africa he became a solicitor.

Reid was a lower-order batsman, right-arm bowler and brilliant fieldsman who played first-class cricket for Western Province from 1920 to 1923. He took 4 for 52 and 1 for 21 and made 25 runs for once out when Western Province lost to the touring Australians at Newlands in November 1921. He was selected for the Third and final Test that began on the same ground four days later and made 17 runs and took two wickets. It was his only Test. His most successful first-class match came in Western Province's Currie Cup victory over Orange Free State later that season, when he scored 38 not out and 81 not out (the highest score in the match) and took 1 for 29 and 3 for 43.

Reid died in June 1947 in what his Wisden obituary described as "tragic circumstances". Later research by Brian Bassano and David Frith revealed that Reid was murdered by his wife who suffered from mental health problems and later took her own life.

References

External links
 

1890 births
1947 deaths
Alumni of Diocesan College, Cape Town
Alumni of Oriel College, Oxford
South Africa Test cricketers
South African cricketers
Western Province cricketers
South African rugby union players
Oxford University RFC players
Recipients of the Military Cross
Companions of the Distinguished Service Order
South African military personnel of World War I
British Army personnel of World War I
Royal Field Artillery soldiers